= Prague in Black =

2007 book by Chad Bryant

Prague in Black: Nazi Rule and Czech Nationalism
- Author: Chad Bryant
- Genre: History
- Publication date: 2007

Prague in Black: Nazi Rule and Czech Nationalism (2007) is a book by the American historian Chad Bryant about how Czech nationalism developed in the German-occupied Protectorate of Bohemia and Moravia during World War II.

== Reception ==
The book received mostly favorable reviews.
