= Chad Bryant =

American historian

Chad Bryant is an American historian of central and eastern Europe, especially the lands of present-day Czechia. His previous books have focused on questions of nationalism, belonging, and the urban experience. He recently published, with Kateřina Čapková and Diana Dumitru, a book about Stalinist-era show trials in Czechoslovakia. His current research projects focus on conspiracy theories and libel laws in the early twentieth century. He is a Professor of History at the University of North Carolina at Chapel Hill.

== Works ==
- with Kateřina Čapková and Diana Dumitru, The Slánský Trial: A New History
- Prague: Belonging in the Modern City. Harvard University Press.
- Prague in Black: Nazi Rule and Czech Nationalism
- with Cynthia Radding and Paul Readman, Borderlands in World History, 1700-1914
- with Arthur Burns and Paul Readman, Walking Histories, 1800-1914

== Awards ==
František Palacký Honorary Medal for Merit in Historical Sciences, Czech Academy of Sciences

Radomír Luža Prize from The Austrian Marshall Plan Center for European Studies at the University of New Orleans, the American Friends of the Documentation Center of Austrian Resistance, and the German Studies Association

American Council of Learned Societies Collaboration Research Fellowship, with Kateřina Čapková and Diana Dumitru

Hans Rosenberg Book Prize, Conference Group for Central European History

Honorable mention, Wayne S. Vucinich Book Prize of the Association for Slavic, East European, and Eurasian Studies
